A document management system (DMS) is usually a computerized system used to store, share, track and manage files or documents. Some systems include history tracking where a log of the various versions created and modified by different users is recorded. The term has some overlap with the concepts of content management systems. It is often viewed as a component of enterprise content management (ECM) systems and related to digital asset management, document imaging, workflow systems and records management systems.

History
Beginning in the 1980s, a number of vendors began to develop software systems to manage paper-based documents. These systems dealt with paper documents, including printed and published documents and photographs, prints, etc.

Later developers began to write a second type of system that could manage electronic documents, i.e., all those documents, or files, created on computers, and often stored on users' local file-systems. The earliest Electronic document management (EDM) systems managed either proprietary file types or a limited number of file formats. Many of these systems later became known as document imaging systems, because they focused on the capture, storage, indexing and retrieval of image file formats. EDM systems evolved to a point where systems could manage any file format that could be stored on the network. The applications grew to encompass electronic documents, collaboration tools, security, workflow, and auditing capabilities.

These systems enabled an organization to capture faxes and forms, to save copies of the documents as images, and to store the image files in the repository for security and quick retrieval (retrieval made possible because the system handled the extraction of the text from the document in the process of capture, and the text-indexer function provided text-retrieval capabilities).

While many EDM systems store documents in their native file format (Microsoft Word or Excel, PDF), some web-based document management systems are beginning to store content in the form of HTML. These HTML-based document management systems can act as publishing systems or policy management systems.  Content is captured either by using browser based editors or the importing and conversion of not HTML content.  Storing documents as HTML enables a simpler full-text workflow as most search engines deal with HTML natively.  DMS without an HTML storage format is required to extract the text from the proprietary format making the full text search workflow slightly more complicated.

Search capabilities including boolean queries, cluster analysis, and stemming have become critical components of DMS as users have grown used to internet searching and spend less time organizing their content.

Components
Document management systems commonly provide storage, versioning, metadata, security, as well as indexing and retrieval capabilities. Here is a description of these components:

Standardization
Many industry associations publish their own lists of particular document control standards that are used in their particular field. Following is a list of some of the relevant ISO documents. Divisions ICS 01.140.10 and 01.140.20. The ISO has also published a series of standards regarding the technical documentation, covered by the division of 01.110.
 ISO 2709 Information and documentation – Format for information exchange
 ISO 15836 Information and documentation – The Dublin Core metadata element set
 ISO 15489 Information and documentation – Records management
 ISO 21127 Information and documentation – A reference ontology for the interchange of cultural heritage information
 ISO 23950 Information and documentation – Information retrieval (Z39.50) – Application service definition and protocol specification
 ISO 10244 Document management – Business process baselining and analysis
 ISO 32000 Document management – Portable document format
 ISO/IEC 27001 Specification for an information security management system

Document control
Government regulations require that companies working in certain industries control their documents. These industries include accounting (for example: 8th EU Directive, Sarbanes–Oxley Act), food safety (e.g., Food Safety Modernization Act in the US), ISO (mentioned above), medical device manufacturing (FDA), manufacture of blood, human cells, and tissue products (FDA), healthcare (JCAHO), and information technology (ITIL).
Some industries work under stricter document control requirements due to the type of information they retain for privacy, warranty, or other highly regulated purposes. Examples include protected health information (PHI) as required by HIPAA or construction project documents required for warranty periods. An information systems strategy plan (ISSP) can shape organisational information systems over medium to long-term periods.

Documents stored in a document management system—such as procedures, work instructions, and policy statements—provide evidence of documents under control. Failing to comply can cause fines, the loss of business, or damage to a business's reputation.

The following are important aspects of document control:
 reviewing and approving documents prior to release
 reviews and approvals
 ensuring changes and revisions are clearly identified
 ensuring that relevant versions of applicable documents are available at their "points of use"
 ensuring that documents remain legible and identifiable
 ensuring that external documents (such as customer-supplied documents or supplier manuals) are identified and controlled
 preventing “unintended” use of obsolete documents

Integrated DM
Integrated document management comprises the technologies, tools, and methods used to capture, manage, store, preserve, deliver and dispose of 'documents' across an enterprise. In this context 'documents' are any of a myriad of information assets including images, office documents, graphics, and drawings as well as the new electronic objects such as Web pages, email, instant messages, and video.

Document management software
Paper documents have long been used in storing information. However, paper can be costly and, if used excessively, wasteful. Document management software is not simply a tool but it lets a user manage access, track and edit information stored. Document management software is an electronic cabinet that can be used to organize all paper and digital files. The software helps the businesses to combine paper to digital files and store it into a single hub after it is scanned and digital formats get imported. One of the most important benefits of digital document management is a “fail-safe” environment for safeguarding all documents and data. In the heavy construction industry specifically, document management software allows team members to securely view and upload documents for projects they are assigned to from anywhere and at any time to help streamline day-to-day operations.

See also

 Construction collaboration technology
 Customer communications management
 Data proliferation
 Document automation
 Documentation
 Enterprise content management
 Information repository
 Information science
 Intelligent document
 Knowledge base
 Knowledge management
 Library science
 Product data management
 Revision control
 Snippet management
 Taxonomy (general)
 Technical data management system
 Technical documentation

References

External links

 

Records management technology